Rafael Édgar Dudamel Ochoa (born January 7, 1973), is a Venezuelan football manager and former player who played as a goalkeeper. 

As a player, Dudamel made 56 appearances for the Venezuela national team.

Playing career

Club
During his career, Dudamel played for several Venezuelan and Colombian football clubs. Among the Venezuelan clubs are Universidad de Los Andes, El Vigía, Atlético Zulia, UA Maracaibo and Deportivo Táchira. Atlético Huila, Independiente Santa Fe, Deportivo Cali, Millonarios and Cortulua are the Colombian clubs where he played. He has also played for Quilmes, of Argentina. He was transferred to Mamelodi Sundowns, of South Africa in 2005. In 2007 after the Copa America, he transferred to América de Cali, a top Colombian club, alongside Venezuelan international Jorge Rojas. He left América and returned to Estudiantes de Mérida on August 29, 2008.

International
As of November 2007, Dudamel has 56 caps and one goal for the Venezuela national football team. He was capped for the first time in 1993. He scored a direct free kick in the World Cup 1998 qualifier against Argentina.

International goal

|-
| 1. || October 9, 1996 || Pueblo Nuevo, San Cristóbal, Venezuela ||  || 2–4 || 2–5 || 1998 FIFA World Cup qualification || 
|}

Managerial career
On 18 October 2017 Dudamel is appointed manager of Venezuela’s national football team.

On 5 June 2016 Dudamel gets his first win in an official tournament as national coach with a
1-0 victory over Jamaica in the 2016 Copa America. In his next match at the tournament, he upsets Uruguay 1-0. The winner was scored by Salomon Rondón, who tapped in after a long range attempt by Alejandro Guerra was saved. In the final group match, he drew against Mexico 1-1. In the knockout stages, Venezuela lost immediately, 4-1 to Argentina.

At the 2017 FIFA Under-20 World Cup, Dudamel led the U20s to the final, where they lost to England 1-0 in the final. It was the nation's best ever performance at U20 competition.

On 2 January 2020, he resigned from the Venezuela national team, and four days later signed a two-year contract with Brazilian club Atlético Mineiro. On 27 February 2020, he was sacked by Atlético, following eliminations from the Copa Sudamericana and the Copa do Brasil.

He spent time at Universidad de Chile between 2020 and 2021, and in September 2021 he was appointed as manager of Deportivo Cali, becoming Colombian champion at the end of the season.

Honors

Club
Universidad de Los Andes
 Primera División Venezolana 1990–91

Santa Fe
 Copa Conmebol: Runners Up 1995

Atlético Zulia'''
 Primera División Venezolana: 1997–98

Deportivo Cali
 Copa Mustang: 1998
 Copa Merconorte: Runners Up 1998
 Copa Libertadores: Runners Up 1999

Millonarios
 Copa Merconorte: 2001

Mamelodi Sundowns
 Premier Soccer League 2005–06

Coach

International
Venezuela U-20
FIFA U-20 World Cup: Runner-up 2017
South American Youth Football Championship: Third Place 2017

Venezuela U-17
South American Under-17 Football Championship: Runner-Up 2013

Club
Deportivo Cali
Categoría Primera A: 2021–II

Managerial Statistics

 Official FIFA matches only.

References

External links
 International statistics at rsssf
 
 Colombia.com 

1973 births
Living people
Venezuelan footballers
Venezuela international footballers
People from San Felipe, Venezuela
1991 Copa América players
1993 Copa América players
1995 Copa América players
1997 Copa América players
2001 Copa América players
Copa América Centenario managers
2019 Copa América managers
Association football goalkeepers
Atlético Huila footballers
Independiente Santa Fe footballers
Zulia F.C. players
Quilmes Atlético Club footballers
Deportivo Cali footballers
Millonarios F.C. players
UA Maracaibo players
Cortuluá footballers
Deportivo Táchira F.C. players
Mamelodi Sundowns F.C. players
Estudiantes de Mérida players
América de Cali footballers
Real Esppor Club players
Venezuelan Primera División players
Categoría Primera A players
Venezuelan expatriate footballers
Expatriate soccer players in South Africa
Expatriate footballers in Colombia
Venezuelan expatriate sportspeople in Colombia
Expatriate footballers in Argentina
Venezuelan football managers
Estudiantes de Mérida managers
Asociación Civil Deportivo Lara managers
Venezuela national football team managers
Clube Atlético Mineiro managers
Venezuelan expatriate sportspeople in South Africa
Venezuelan expatriate sportspeople in Argentina
Venezuelan expatriate sportspeople in Brazil
Expatriate football managers in Brazil
Deportivo Cali managers